The Handball International Championships are yearly held competitions where many countries and regions play the handball sports derived from the Jeu de paume.

It is organized by the International Ball game Confederation, and there are three official varieties (International fronton, International game, and Llargues), but local modalities are also played.

Statistics

2008

2007

2006

2005

2004

2003

2002

2001

2000

1999

1998

1997

1996

1995

1994

1993

Relevant facts of the Handball International Championships 
 The Valencian players represent Spain, but they show the Senyera and wear suits under the name Valencian Pilota Squad .
 1994: Belgian Handball Federation quits from the International Confederation and the country is represented by Second division players.
 1995: The Valencian Squad doesn't take part due to an argument with the CIJB because of the kind of ball Italy proposed to play with.
 1996: The Belgian Federation threats with fining the First division players who wanted to take part.
 2004: The Belgian Federation allows First division players to take part.
 2005: The European Championship should be played on Belgium, but the CIJB decides to let place to Colombia to host in January 2006 the World Championship.
 2006: The World Championship on Colombia is not played, first due to security of the players and later due to the eruption of the Galeras volcano.

Best players 
Every year the most relevant players are awarded as the Best player:

 1993: Sarasol I (Genovés, Valencia)
 1998: Grau (València)
 1999: Grau (València)
 2002: Sarasol II (Genovés, Valencia)
 2004: Silverio Deiby Mena, Colombia
 2007: Johan van der Meulen, Netherlands

See also 
 Frisian handball
 Longue paume
 Pallone
 Valencian pilota

External links 
 International Ball Game Confederation
 Pallapugno World Championship 2004
 VII European Championship, at Belgium, 2007

1993 establishments in Europe
Handball sports